Memsaab is a 1971 Bollywood drama film directed by Atma Ram. The film stars Vinod Khanna and Yogeeta Bali.

Cast
Yogeeta Bali as Kiran 
Vinod Khanna as Arjun 
Johnny Walker as Ramkhilavan 
Bindu   
Jayshree T.   
G. Asrani  
Abhi Bhattacharya  
Tarun Bose   
Rajan Haksar   
Hercules   
Naval Kumar   
Mac Mohan  
Aashoo Mrdula   
Rajan   
Jagdish Raj   
Shakoor

Music
This film had music composed by the duo Sonik Omi and the songs were penned by the lyricist Verma Malik.
"Suno Suno Ek Baat Kahu" - Mohammed Rafi, Lata Mangeshkar
"Mujhe Dhund Le Aa Kar Saiya" - Lata Mangeshkar
"Jab Se Tere Mere Man Me" - Lata Mangeshkar, Minoo Purushottam
"Hai Re Mohe Laage" - Asha Bhosle
"Kismat Se Jaal Me" - Manna Dey

External links
 

Music Director Duo : Sonik Omi

1971 films
Films scored by Sonik-Omi
1970s Hindi-language films
1971 drama films